How Hill is a hamlet on the River Ant within The Broads National Park in Ludham parish, Norfolk, England.

How Hill House, completed in 1903, was designed by Thomas Boardman, son of the architect Edward Boardman; he was Mayor of Norwich in 1905–1906. Since 1984 the house has been the home of How Hill Trust, an educational charity.

The How Hill Nature Reserve is administered by the Broads Authority.

Toad Hole Museum is a former marshman's cottage and also houses the Broads Information Centre.

Boardman's Windmill is a trestle or skeleton windpump, and Clayrack Drainage Mill is similar, only smaller. Just south of How Hill is Turf Fen windpump.

References

Hamlets in Norfolk
Norfolk Broads
Nature reserves in Norfolk
Nature centres in England
Ludham